Suoshanqiao West is a station of Line 3 and Line 5 of the Suzhou Metro. The station is located in Huqiu District, Suzhou. It has been in use since December 25, 2019; when Line 3 first opened to the public, and acts as one of three interchanges between the two lines.

References 

Railway stations in Jiangsu
Suzhou Rail Transit stations
Railway stations in China opened in 2019